In statistics, a lack-of-fit test is any of many tests of a null hypothesis that a proposed statistical model fits well.  See:

 Goodness of fit
 Lack-of-fit sum of squares